The Dorset Horn is an endangered British breed of domestic sheep. It is documented from the seventeenth century, and is highly prolific, sometimes producing two lambing seasons per year. Among British sheep, it is the only breed capable of breeding throughout the winter.

History 

The Dorset Horn originated in Dorset in south-west England. Like the extinct Pink-nosed Somerset to which it is related, it probably derived from cross-breeding of Merinos imported from Spain with local tan-faced sheep similar to the modern Portland. Unlike many British lowland breeds, Dorset sheep were not influenced by cross-breeding with the Leicester or Southdown breeds which were much used for this purpose in the latter eighteenth and early nineteenth centuries. A breeders' society, the Dorset Horn Sheep Breeders' Association, was set up in 1891 and the first flock book was published in the following year.

The Dorset Horn was exported to many countries, among them Australia, South Africa and the United States, where the first arrivals were in the 1860s, and where substantial numbers were imported from about 1880. The Dorset Horn reached Australia in 1895, and New Zealand in 1897.

A polled variant of the breed, the Poll Dorset, was bred in Australia through cross-breeding with the hornless Corriedale and Ryeland breeds. From about 1950, this was introduced to the United Kingdom, where it rapidly supplanted the horned variant; the breed association changed its name in 1981 to the Dorset Horn and Poll Dorset Sheep Breeder's Association, and registers both breeds. A different polled variant of the breed arose in the United States, derived from a polled sport in a flock kept by North Carolina State University. This Polled Dorset was registered with the breed association – the Continental Dorset Club – from 1956; as elsewhere, it soon became more widespread than the original horned type.

The world-wide conservation status of the Dorset Horn was listed by the FAO as "not at risk" in 2007. At country level, it is listed as "vulnerable" by the Rare Breeds Trust of Australia, as "priority" by the Rare Breeds Conservation Society of New Zealand, and as  "threatened" by the Livestock Conservancy in the USA. In the United Kingdom, where in the 1980s there were more than 100,000 breeding ewes, its status is listed by the Rare Breeds Survival Trust as "at risk", meaning that the total number is between 900 and 1500 head.

The Dorset Horn has contributed to the development of several other breeds: the Dorper and Dormer breeds of South Africa, through cross-breeding with the Blackhead Persian and Merinos respectively; and the British Milksheep and Cadzow Improver in the United Kingdom.

Characteristics

The Dorset Horn is white-woolled and white-faced; the nostrils are a characteristic pink. It is horned in both sexes, with heavy spiral horns on rams.

Popular culture 
The mascot for the University of North Carolina at Chapel Hill, Rameses, is an anthropomorphic Dorset Horn. In addition, the school owns a live Dorset Horn (also named Rameses), that makes regular appearances at football games.

References

Further reading 
 Henry Stewart (1898). The Domestic Sheep.

Sheep breeds
Culture in Dorset
Sheep breeds originating in the United Kingdom
Animal breeds on the RBST Watchlist